The 1949 Idaho Vandals football team represented the University of Idaho in the 1949 college football season. The Vandals were led by third-year head coach Dixie Howell and were members of the Pacific Coast Conference. Home games were played on campus at Neale Stadium in Moscow, with one game in Boise, a final time at Public School Field.

Idaho was  overall and won one of their five PCC games.

The Vandals' losing streak in the Battle of the Palouse with neighbor Washington State reached 21 games, with a  homecoming loss in Moscow. Idaho tied the Cougars the next year, but the winless streak continued until five years later.

In the rivalry game with Montana in Missoula the following week, Idaho won  to retain the Little Brown Stein in the Grizzlies' last year in the PCC. Montana returned the favor in Moscow the next year with a one-point upset, then the Vandals won eight straight, through 1959.

Babe Curfman was hired as the ends coach in February 1949; he became head coach in

Schedule

All-conference
Tackle Carl Kiilsgaard was named to the All-Coast team; honorable mention were tackle Will Overgaard, guard Roy Colquitt, quarterback John Brogan, and halfback Jerry Diehl.

NFL Draft
Two seniors from the 1949 Vandals were selected in the 1950 NFL Draft:

Three juniors were selected in the 1951 NFL Draft:

One sophomore was selected in the 1952 NFL Draft:

List of Idaho Vandals in the NFL Draft

References

External links
Gem of the Mountains: 1950 University of Idaho yearbook – 1949 football season
Go Mighty Vandals – 1949 football season
Idaho Argonaut – student newspaper – 1949 editions

Idaho
Idaho Vandals football seasons
Idaho Vandals football